Richard Shawn Slocum (born February 21, 1965) is an American football coach who was the special teams coach for the  Green Bay Packers of the National Football League (NFL) and most recently was the associate head coach, special teams coordinator and outside linebackers coach at Arizona State University.

Early life and college career
Born in Monticello, Arkansas, Slocum graduated from Bryan High School in Bryan, Texas in 1983 and attended Texas A&M University, where he played football as a linebacker and was a member of the 12th Man Kickoff Team under coach Jackie Sherrill. Slocum earned one letter with the team in 1984. He graduated with a B.S. in construction management in 1987 from the Texas A&M College of Architecture.

Coaching career
Slocum started his coaching career as a volunteer assistant at Texas A&M, under his father R. C. Slocum. In 1990, Shawn served as a graduate assistant at the University of Pittsburgh, coaching the defense. He returned to coaching at Texas A&M, coaching tight ends, linebackers, and special teams from 1991 to 1997. From 1991 to 1993, Slocum helped the Aggies win three straight Southwest Conference championships. During the years 1994–97, he coached two all-Americans, Shane Lechler and Lombardi Award winner Dat Nguyen, who both went on to play for the NFL. During his seven-season coaching tenure at A&M, he assisted the Aggies to five bowl games, including four Cotton Bowl Classic appearances. The Aggie team record was 94-28-2 from 1991 to 1997. The 94 wins were the sixth in the country and also the greatest wins by any Texas Division I school in any decade. From 1998 to 1999, Slocum coached at the University of Southern California, where he coached Butkus Award winner Chris Claiborne, Zeke Moreno, and Markus Steele. He returned to A&M again and coached the Secondary and special teams from 2000 to 2002. In 2005, he became assistant head coach and linebacker coach at Ole Miss, where he coached star linebacker Patrick Willis.

On February 6, 2006, Slocum joined the Packers, becoming the assistant special teams coach. He got promoted to special teams coordinator on January 14, 2009.

The Dallas Morning News ranked the Packers special teams units 29th in 2010 and 31st in 2011.

The Packers' special teams units were ranked 12th in 2012 and 20th in 2013 by the Dallas Morning News.

On January 30, 2015, the Packers fired Slocum.

On March 2, 2015, Slocum joined Todd Graham's coaching staff at Arizona State University as associate head coach, special teams coordinator, and outside linebackers coach.

On January 9, 2018, Slocum was retained as Sun Devils special teams coordinator and associate head coach.

Personal life
His father R. C. Slocum was head coach for Texas A&M from 1989 to 2002 and is the winningest coach in Texas A&M football history. R. C. Slocum was a tight end at McNeese State when Shawn was born. Shawn Slocum has been an assistant coach at Texas A&M under R. C. Slocum.

Shawn Slocum is currently married to the former Michelle Biehl and has four children (daughters, Tayler, Jordyn, Haley and son Jaxon).

References

External links

Packers' bio

1965 births
Green Bay Packers coaches
Living people
Texas A&M Aggies football players
Texas A&M Aggies football coaches
USC Trojans football coaches
People from Bryan, Texas
Pittsburgh Panthers football coaches
Sportspeople from Lake Charles, Louisiana
University of Pittsburgh alumni
Ole Miss Rebels football coaches
Players of American football from Texas
Players of American football from Louisiana
American football linebackers
People from Monticello, Arkansas
Arizona State Sun Devils football coaches